The Za dynasty or Zuwa dynasty were rulers of a medieval kingdom based in the towns of Kukiya and Gao on the Niger River in what is today modern Mali. The Songhai people at large all descended from this kingdom. The most notable of them being the Zarma people of Niger who derive their name "Zarma (Za Hama)" from this dynasty, which means "the descendants of Za".

Oral history and the Tarikh al-Sudan
Al-Sadi's seventeenth century chronicle, the Tarikh al-Sudan, provides an early history of the Songhay as handed down by oral tradition. The chronicle reports that the legendary founder of the dynasty, Za Alayaman (also called Dialliaman), originally came from the Yemen and settled in the town of Kukiya. The town is believed to have been near the modern village of Bentiya on the eastern bank of the Niger River, north of the Fafa rapids, 134 km south east of Gao. Tombstones with Arabic inscriptions dating from the 14th and 15th centuries have been found in the area. Kukiya is also mentioned in the other important chronicle, the Tarikh al-fattash. The Tarikh al-Sudan relates that the 15th ruler, Za Kusoy, converted to Islam in the year 1009-1010 A.D. At some stage the kingdom or at least its political focus moved north to Gao. The kingdom of Gao capitalized on the growing trans-Saharan trade and grew into a small regional power before being conquered by the Mali Empire in the early 13th century.

Rulers of the Za dynasty as given in the Tarikh al-Sudan
These names with their diacritics are as given in the translation by John Hunwick. The surviving Arabic manuscripts differ both in the spelling and the vocalization of the names. 
  
Alayaman
Zakoi
Takoi
Ikoi
Kū
ʿAlī Fay
Biya Kumay
Bī/Bay
Karay
Yama Karaway
Yuma Dunku
Yuma Kībuʿu
Kūkura
Kinkin
Kusoy
Kusur Dāri
Hin Kun Wunka Dum
Biyay Koi Kīma
Koy Kīmi
Nuntā Sanay
Biyay Kayna Kinba
Kayna Shinyunbu
Tib
Yama Dao
Fadazaw
ʿAlī Kur
Bēr Falaku
Yāsiboy
Dūru
Zunku Bāru
Bisi Bāru
Badā

See also
Mali Empire
Songhai Empire
Sonni dynasty

Notes

References

 Link is to a scan on Gallica that omits some photographs of the epigraphs.

Further reading
 Also available from Aluka but requires subscription.

Songhai Empire